Gavriil Budyonny (born 1917) was a Soviet equestrian. He competed in two events at the 1952 Summer Olympics.

References

External links
 

1917 births
Possibly living people
Soviet male equestrians
Olympic equestrians of the Soviet Union
Equestrians at the 1952 Summer Olympics
Place of birth missing (living people)